The title page of a book, thesis or other written work is the page at or near the front which displays its title, subtitle, author, publisher, and edition, often artistically decorated. (A half title, by contrast, displays only the title of a work.)

The title page is one of the most important parts of the "front matter" or "preliminaries" of a book, as the data on it and its verso (together known as the "title leaf") are used to establish the "title proper and usually, though not necessarily, the statement of responsibility and the data relating to publication". This determines the way the book is cited in library catalogs and academic references.

The title page often shows the title of the work, the person or body responsible for its intellectual content, and the imprint, which contains the name and address of the book's publisher and its date of publication. Particularly in paperback editions it may contain a shorter title than the cover or lack a descriptive subtitle. Further information about the publication of the book, including its copyright information, is frequently printed on the verso of the title page. Also often included there are the ISBN and a "printer's key", also known as the "number line", which indicates the print run to which the volume belongs.

The first printed books, or incunabula, did not have title pages: the text simply begins on the first page, and the book is often identified by the initial words—the incipit—of the text proper. Other older books may have bibliographic information on the colophon at the end of the book.

The Bulla Cruciatae contra Turcos (1463) is the earliest use of a title on the first page.

See also
 Colophon
 Book design
 Half title
 Printer's key

References

External links

Prints & People: A Social History of Printed Pictures, an exhibition catalog from The Metropolitan Museum of Art (fully available online as PDF), which contains material on title pages
Glasgow University Library, Special Collections Department, Book of the Month

Book design
Typography